Francis Douglas Memorial College is an all-boys state integrated Catholic school with boarding facilities located in Westown, New Plymouth, New Zealand.  The college was founded in 1959 under the leadership of the De La Salle Brothers, a religious order of brothers based on the teachings of St. Jean-Baptiste de la Salle. It is one of two secondary schools established by the Brothers in New Zealand, the other being De La Salle College, Mangere East, Auckland. The name of the school is dedicated to the memory of Father Francis Vernon Douglas, a missionary priest who was killed while doing missionary work in the Philippines during the Second World War. The school educates approximately 760 boys, 130 of whom are boarders. The 60th Jubilee of Francis Douglas Memorial College was held on Queen's Birthday Weekend, 2019.

Sporting

74% of students participate in at least one sport. The most popular sport at the school is rugby union, other sports include cricket, basketball, soccer, rowing, and athletic events. Annually, the school plays a rugby union match against major cross-town rivals New Plymouth Boys' High School, this being one of the major events on the school calendar.

Music
Francis Douglas Memorial College has a music department where bands develop their talents. Many students have performed in the annual Smokefree Rockquest competition, with bands from the College winning two Regional Finals.
Students have performed at the G-TARanaki Guitar Festival and were shown guitar skills by Uli Jon Roth.

Māori culture 
The school runs cultural activities, such as the Annual Inter-house Haka Competition, and school camping trips to a marae.

The first inter-house Haka Competition was in 2010. Students register their names for the activity and each House performs their Haka with the school as an audience. The winning house is chosen by a judge who is a popular figure from New Plymouth.

The school has a school Haka written by an ex-student Hemi Sundgrem which is about the founders of the school, Francis Douglas and the De La Salle Brothers.

Boarding

Lasalle House is the boarding hostel for Francis Douglas Memorial College.

Houses
Benildus (green)
La Salle (yellow)
Loreto (blue)
Solomon (red)

Notable alumni

Academia 
Br. Peter Bray - Vice-Chancellor, Bethlehem University
Michael Kelly - Prince Philip Professor of Technology, University of Cambridge

Arts 

 Anthony McCarten – author, playwright and screenwriter

Broadcasting 

 Patrick Gower – journalist
 Jim Hickey – weather presenter

Public service 

Andrew Harris  - mountain guide who died in the 1996 Mount Everest disaster
Steven Joyce - Member of Parliament (2008–2018)

Sport

Athletics 

 Michael Aish

Swimming 

 Zac Reid  - (Olympian)

Football 

 Frank van Hattum 
 Oskar van Hattum

Rugby union 
Beauden Barrett
Jordie Barrett 
Kane Barrett
Scott Barrett
Shane Cleaver
Liam Coltman 
Scott Fuglistaller 
Du'Plessis Kirifi 
Deacon Manu 
John Mitchell 
Jayson Potroz 
Leon Power
Jacob Ratumaitavuki-Kneepkens 
Ricky Riccitelli
Conrad Smith 
Teihorangi Walden
Paul Williams (rugby referee) – Rugby union referee

Notable staff
 Peter Ingram- Cricket coach (now at Hawera High School)
 Ian Snook - Cricket coach
 Tim Weston - Cricket coach

References

External links
Francis Douglas Memorial College website

Boarding schools in New Zealand
Boys' schools in New Zealand
Educational institutions established in 1959
Schools in New Plymouth
Secondary schools in Taranaki]
Catholic secondary schools in New Zealand
1959 establishments in New Zealand
Christchurch